Lymanopoda is a butterfly genus from the subfamily Satyrinae in the family Nymphalidae found in north-western South America.

Species
Listed alphabetically:
Lymanopoda acraeida Butler, 1868 – acraeid mimic satyr
Lymanopoda albocincta Hewitson, 1861 – white-banded mountain satyr
Lymanopoda albomaculata Hewitson, 1861 – pearled mountain satyr
Lymanopoda altaselva Adams & Bernard, 1979
Lymanopoda altis Weymer, 1890
Lymanopoda apulia Hopffer, 1874 – Apulia mountain satyr
Lymanopoda araneola Pyrcz, 2004
Lymanopoda caeruleata Godman & Salvin, 1880
Lymanopoda caracara Pyrcz, Willmott & Hall, 1999
Lymanopoda caucana Weymer, 1911
Lymanopoda caudalis Rosenberg & Talbot, 1914
Lymanopoda cinna Godman & Salvin, 1889 – blue-stained satyr
Lymanopoda confusa Brown, 1943
Lymanopoda dietzi Adams & Bernardi, 1981
Lymanopoda dyari Pyrcz, 2004
Lymanopoda eubagioides Butler, 1873 – pale mountain satyr
Lymanopoda euopis Godman & Salvin, 1878
Lymanopoda excisa Weymer, 1912
Lymanopoda ferruginosa Butler, 1868 – rusty mountain satyr
Lymanopoda galactea Staudinger, 1897
Lymanopoda hazelana Brown, 1943
Lymanopoda huilana Weymer, 1890
Lymanopoda hyagnis Weymer, 1911
Lymanopoda ichu Pyrcz, Willmott & Hall, 1999
Lymanopoda inde Pyrcz, 2004
Lymanopoda ingasayana Pyrcz, 2004
Lymanopoda ionius Westwood, [1851]
Lymanopoda labda Hewitson, 1861
Lymanopoda labineta Hewitson, 1870
Lymanopoda lactea Hewitson, 1861
Lymanopoda lebbaea C. & R. Felder, 1867
Lymanopoda magna Pyrcz, 2004
Lymanopoda maletera Adams & Bernard, 1979
Lymanopoda marianna Staudinger, 1897
Lymanopoda melendeza Adams, 1986
Lymanopoda melia Weymer, 1912
Lymanopoda nadia Pyrcz, 1999
Lymanopoda nevada Krüger, 1924
Lymanopoda nivea Staudinger, 1888
Lymanopoda obsoleta (Westwood, [1851]) – obsoleta satyr
Lymanopoda orientalis Viloria & Camacho, 1999
Lymanopoda panacea (Hewitson, 1869)
Lymanopoda paramera Adams & Bernard, 1979
Lymanopoda pieridina Röber, 1927
Lymanopoda prusia (Heimlich, 1973)
Lymanopoda rana Weymer, 1912
Lymanopoda samius Westwood, [1851]
Lymanopoda schmidti Adams, 1986
Lymanopoda shefteli Dyar, 1913
Lymanopoda tolima Weymer, 1911
Lymanopoda translucida Weymer, 1912 – golden mountain satyr
Lymanopoda venosa Butler, 1868
Lymanopoda viventieni (Apolinar, 1924)

References

Satyrini
Nymphalidae of South America
Butterfly genera
Taxa named by John O. Westwood